youtube-dl is a free and open source download manager for video and audio from YouTube and over 1,000 other video hosting websites. It is released under the Unlicense software license.

As of September 2021, youtube-dl is one of the most starred projects on GitHub, with over 100,000 stars. According to libraries.io, 308 other packages and 1.43k repositories depend on it. Numerous forks exist of the project.

History
youtube-dl was created in 2006 by Ricardo Garcia. Initially, only YouTube was supported, but as the project grew, it began supporting other video sharing websites.

Ricardo Garcia stepped down as maintainer in 2011 and was replaced by Philipp Hagemeister, who later stepped down and was replaced by dstftw. In 2021, dstftw stepped down and was replaced by dirkf.

RIAA takedown request 
On October 23, 2020, the Recording Industry Association of America (RIAA) issued a takedown notice to GitHub under the Digital Millennium Copyright Act (DMCA), requesting the removal of youtube-dl and 17 public forks of the project. The RIAA request argued that youtube-dl violates the Section 1201 anti-circumvention provisions of the DMCA, and provisions of German copyright law, since it circumvents a "rolling cipher" used by YouTube to generate the URL for the video file itself (which the RIAA has considered to be an effective technical protection measure, since it is "intended to inhibit direct access to the underlying YouTube video files, thereby preventing or inhibiting the downloading, copying, or distribution of the video files"), and that its documentation expressly encouraged its use with copyrighted media by listing music videos by RIAA-represented artists as examples. GitHub initially complied with the request.

Users criticized the takedown, noting the legitimate uses for the application, including downloading video content released under  open licensing schemes or to create derivative works falling under fair use (such as for archival and news reporting purposes). Public attention to the takedown resulted in a Streisand effect reminiscent to that of the DeCSS takedown. Users reposted the software's source code across the internet in multiple formats. For example, users posted images on Twitter containing the whole youtube-dl source code encoded in different colors on each pixel. GitHub users also filed pull requests to GitHub's own repository of DMCA takedown notices that included youtube-dl source code.

On November 16, 2020, GitHub publicly reinstated the repository, after the Electronic Frontier Foundation sent GitHub a document contesting that the software was not capable of breaching commercial DRM systems. GitHub also announced that future takedown claims under Section 1201 would be manually scrutinized on a case-by-case basis by legal and technical experts.

Example code 
For downloading video or playlist:
 youtube-dl <url>
Path of the output can be specified as: (file name to be included in the path)
 youtube-dl -o <path> <url>
To see list of all available file formats and sizes:
 youtube-dl -F <url>

The video can be downloaded by selecting the format code from the list or typing the format manually:
 youtube-dl -f <format/code> <url>

Best quality video can be downloaded with -f best option. Also, the quality of audio and video streams can be specified separately and merged with the + operator. 

A portion of the video can be downloaded with the help of ffmpeg.

See also 
 Comparison of YouTube downloaders
 Stream ripping
 YouTube Vanced

References

External links

 
 

Command-line software
Download managers
Free software programmed in Python
Public-domain software with source code
Software using the Unlicense license
YouTube